Roitham am Traunfall (before December 2016 only Roitham) is a municipality in the district of Gmunden in the Austrian state of Upper Austria.

Municipal arrangement

Roitham am Traunfall is divided into the following boroughs: Watzing, Außerpühret, Außerroh, Oberbuch, Mitterbuch, Palmsdorf and Wangham.

Politics
The results of the last election of the local government in 2015:

 SPÖ: 11 mandates 
 ÖVP: 8 mandates
 FPÖ: 6 mandates

Alfred Gruber (SPÖ) is the current mayor of Roitham.

References

Cities and towns in Gmunden District